The Battle of Zornoza, fought on 31 October 1808, was one of the opening engagements in Napoleon's invasion of Spain. The battle was intended to encircle and crush the left wing of the Spanish front. The Spanish infantry was swiftly thrown back but escaped in good order.

Background 
The Dos de Mayo Uprising had put Iberia in revolt against French rule. The Spanish conventional warfare had started at El Bruch (June 1808), while the Battle of Bailen (July 1808) marked the first open-field defeat of a Napoleonic army. British intervention had started at Roliça (August 1808), and Napoleon's personal participation in the invasion of Spain started with the engagement of Joaquín Blake's forces at Zornoza. 

Under Napoleon's guidance, the French had made meticulous preparations to defeat Blake's position and thereby beat the left wing of the Spanish front that stretched from Cantabria to the Mediterranean Sea. Owing to friction with the Spanish authorities and a lack of coordination by the Central Junta, Blake, for his part, had no confidence in the Spanish deployment and could do little but conduct a cautious advance in the direction of Bilbao.

Forces 
Lefebvre's IV Corps included three infantry divisions and 36 cannon. Major-General Horace Sébastiani's 1st Division contained the 28th Light and 75th Line (3 battalions) and the 32nd and 58th Line (2 bns.). Maj-Gen Leval's 2nd Division was made up of the Dutch brigade and 2 bns. each of the 2nd Nassau, 4th Baden and Hesse-Darmstadt Gross-und-Erbprinz Regiments, and the Paris National Guard and Frankfurt battalions. Maj-Gen Eugene-Casimir Villatte's 3rd Division included 3 bns. each of the 27th Light, 63rd, 94th and 95th Line.

Blake's Army of Galicia contained three infantry divisions, a vanguard and a reserve. General Figueroa commanded the 1st Division (4,000), Gen Riquelme the 3rd Division (4,800), Gen Carbajal the 4th Division (3,500), Gen Mendizabal (2,900) the Vanguard and Gen Mahy the Reserve (3,000). Only six of Blake's guns came into action.

Battle 

On October 31, 1808, Marshal François Lefebvre bloodied the Army of Galicia under Lieutenant General Joaquín Blake but failed to encircle or destroy it, upsetting both the Emperor and the French strategic situation. Lefebvre had disobeyed Napoleon's orders and launched his IV Corps into a premature attack against Blake. Blake was deeply disturbed by the appearance of French forces and took immediate measures to withdraw his troops and guns. The Spanish infantry, fighting without artillery support, was swiftly thrown back but escaped in good order.

Casualties 
Lefebvre lost 200 casualties and Blake 600. Although the French had managed something of a tactical victory, the battle was a definite strategic blunder: Blake escaped the French trap and conducted a crafty withdrawal, checked his pursuers at Valmaseda, and was not caught until November 10. Ultimately, however, the overwhelming strength of Napoleon's Grande Armée allowed the French to sweep past the tottering Spanish defences and capture Madrid by year's end.

Aftermath
Napoleon's invasion of Spain proceeded with the Battle of Valmaseda.

Notes

References

External links
 

Battles of the Peninsular War
Battles of the Napoleonic Wars
Battles involving France
Battles involving Spain
Battles in the Basque Country (autonomous community)
Battle of Zornoza
Battle of Zornoza
October 1808 events